The bluntspine blenny (Acanthemblemaria exilispinus) is a species of chaenopsid blenny found in coral reefs from Costa Rica to Ecuador, in the eastern central Pacific ocean. It can reach a maximum length of  TL. This species feeds primarily on zooplankton.

References

exilispinus
Western Central American coastal fauna
Fish of Costa Rica
Fish of Panama
Fish of Colombia
Fish of Ecuador
bluntspine blenny